Highland Park Carousel, also known as En-Joie Park Carousel and Ideal Park Carousel, is a historic carousel located at Endwell in Broome County, New York. The carousel was purchased between 1920 and 1925 and moved to its present site in 1967.  It was previously located in Ideal Park (later En-Joie Park).  The carousel is housed in a wooden, one story, 16-sided, enclosed pavilion.   The carousel has 36 figures: 34 horses, one pig and one dog, each of which is a "jumper," and two chariots. It was constructed by the Allan Herschell Company.  It is one of six carousels donated to the citizens of Broome County by George F. Johnson (1857–1948), president of Endicott Johnson Corporation.

It was listed on the National Register of Historic Places in 1992.

See also
Other carousels located in the Greater Binghamton Region:
 C. Fred Johnson Park Carousel
 George F. Johnson Recreation Park Carousel
 George W. Johnson Park Carousel
 Ross Park Carousel
 West Endicott Park Carousel

References

External links
 Visiting information on the Broome County carousels

Parks in Broome County, New York
History of Broome County, New York
Carousels on the National Register of Historic Places in New York (state)
National Register of Historic Places in Broome County, New York
Amusement rides introduced in 1920
Buildings and structures in Broome County, New York
Tourist attractions in Broome County, New York